Jodie Landon is a fictional character from the MTV animated series Daria. She was voiced by Jessica Cydnee Jackson.

In 2020, Comedy Central ordered a spinoff series, Jodie, which will depict the character as a Generation Z post-college graduate entering her first job at a tech company. Tracee Ellis Ross is an executive producer for the show and will voice the titular role. In May 2022, it was announced that Jodie would instead be an animated film.

Daria 
Jodie Landon is one of Lawndale High's few Black students. Her boyfriend throughout the series is Michael "Mack" Mackenzie.

In the Daria series finale Is It College Yet?, Jodie decides to attend the fictional Turner College, a historically Black college, despite being accepted to Crestmore, a fictional top college.

References

Television characters introduced in 1997
Animated characters introduced in 1997
Female characters in animated series
Daria
Animated human characters
Teenage characters in television
Fictional African-American people
Black characters in animation